George Clymer Shaw (March 6, 1866 – February 10, 1960) was a brigadier general in the United States Army and a Medal of Honor recipient for his actions in the Philippine–American War.

Shaw joined the Army from Washington, D.C., in May 1898, and retired in March 1930.

Medal of Honor citation
Rank and organization: First Lieutenant, 27th U.S. Infantry. Place and date: At Fort Pitacus, Lake Lanao, Mindanao, Philippine Islands, May 4, 1903. Entered service at: Washington, D.C. Birth: Pontiac, Mich. Date of issue: June 9, 1904.

Citation: 

For distinguished gallantry in leading the assault and, under a heavy fire from the enemy, maintaining alone his position on the parapet after the first 3 men who followed him there had been killed or wounded, until a foothold was gained by others and the capture of the place assured.

See also

List of Philippine–American War Medal of Honor recipients

References

 

1866 births
1960 deaths
People from Pontiac, Michigan
United States Army Medal of Honor recipients
United States Army officers
American military personnel of the Philippine–American War
United States Army personnel of World War I
Philippine–American War recipients of the Medal of Honor
Recipients of the Silver Star
Military personnel from Michigan